Francesco Camusso (9 March 1908 – 23 June 1995) was an Italian professional road racing cyclist.

Camusso was born in Cumiana, Piedmont, and is ranked among the best Italian climbers ever. In his second year as professional, he won the 1931 Giro d'Italia. In the following year he won a stage at the Tour de France, finished third overall.

His other results include a second place in the 1934 Giro d'Italia and a fourth in the 1935 Tour de France.

He died at Turin in 1995.

Major results

1931
Giro d'Italia:
 Winner overall classification
 Winner 1 stage
1932
 Tour de France:
3rd overall
Winner stage 10
1934
 2nd overall — Giro d'Italia
 Tour de Suisse: 1st King of the Mountains, winner 1 stage
1935
Tour de France:
 Winner Stage 7
1937
Tour de France:
 4th overall
 Winner Stage 13A

References

External links 

Official Tour de France results for Francesco Camusso

1908 births
1995 deaths
Sportspeople from the Metropolitan City of Turin
Italian male cyclists
Giro d'Italia winners
Italian Tour de France stage winners
Tour de Suisse stage winners
Cyclists from Piedmont
Cumiana